John C. O'Sullivan (1841 – after 1885) was a physician and politician in Ontario, Canada. He represented Peterborough East in the Legislative Assembly of Ontario from 1875 to 1879 as a Conservative.

He was born in Northumberland County, Canada West, of Irish descent, and was educated at Victoria University and Queen's University. In 1871, O'Sullivan married Margaret Flanagan. His election in 1875 was appealed but he won the by-election that followed later that year. In 1885, he was named president of the Irish National League branch in Peterborough.

References

External links
 

1841 births
Year of death missing
Progressive Conservative Party of Ontario MPPs